It is uncertain how many motets Johann Sebastian Bach composed, because some have been lost, and there are some doubtful attributions among the surviving ones associated with him. There is a case for regarding the six motets catalogued BWV 225–230 as being authenticated, although there is some doubt about one of them, Lobet den Herrn, alle Heiden. A seventh motet, Ich lasse dich nicht, BWV Anh. 159, which was formerly attributed to Bach's older cousin Johann Christoph Bach, appears to be at least partly by J.S. Bach, and if so was probably composed during his Weimar period.

BWV 228 is another motet which appears to have been written at Weimar, between 1708 and 1717, the others having been composed in Leipzig. 
Several of the motets were written for funerals. There is some uncertainty as to the extent that motets would have been called for in normal church services—there is evidence that the form was considered archaic. The text of Jauchzet dem Herrn, alle Welt, BWV Anh. 160 (whether or not the piece is attributable to Bach) suggests a performance at Christmas. Another possible use is a pedagogical one. Bach's biographer Johann Nikolaus Forkel suggested that the choral writing would have been useful for training Bach's young singers, and Christoph Wolff has argued that this could apply in particular to Singet dem Herrn ein neues Lied.

Bach's motets are his only vocal works that stayed in the canon without interruption between his death in 1750 and the 19th-century Bach Revival. In the early 19th century, six motets (BWV 225, 228, Anh. 159, 229, 227, 226) were among Bach's first printed music, after the second half of the 18th century when the only vocal music by Bach that was printed were collections of his four-part chorales.

BWV 225–230
  (Sing unto the Lord a new song), BWV 225, is a motet in B-flat major scored for two four-part choirs (SATB) which was first performed in Leipzig around 1727. This motet uses Psalm 149:1–3 for its first movement, the third stanza of "Nun lob, mein Seel, den Herren" (a 1530 hymn after Psalm 103 by Johann Gramann) for the second movement, and Psalm 150:2 and 6 for its third movement.
  (The Spirit gives aid to our weakness), BWV 226, a motet in B-flat major scored for two four-part choirs, was performed in Leipzig in 1729 for the funeral of Johann Heinrich Ernesti. The text is taken from the Epistle to the Romans and Martin Luther's third stanza to the hymn "" (1524).
  (Jesus, my joy), BWV 227, is a motet in E minor for five vocal parts. It has been suggested that it was composed in 1723 for the funeral of Johanna Maria Käsin, the wife of the Leipzig postmaster. It takes its title from the hymn "Jesu, meine Freude" by Johann Franck on which it is based. The stanzas of the chorale are interspersed with passages from the Epistle to the Romans. The chorale melody on which several movements are based was by Johann Crüger (1653).
  (Do not fear), BWV 228, is a motet in A major for a funeral, set for double chorus and unspecified instruments playing colla parte. The work in two movements draws its text from the Book of Isaiah and a hymn by Paul Gerhardt. Traditionally, scholars believed that Bach composed it in Leipzig in 1726, while more recent scholarship suggests for stylistic reasons that it was composed during Bach's Weimar period. It has been compared to another motet for double choir, Ich lasse dich nicht, BWV Anh. 159, which is possibly by Bach.
  (Come, Jesus, come), BWV 229, is a motet in G minor composed in Leipzig, which received its first performance by 1731–1732.
  (Praise the Lord, all ye heathen), BWV 230, is a motet in C major scored for four voices, which draws its text from Psalm 117:1–2. Although some scholars have expressed doubts about the attribution to Bach, the work is generally regarded as a surviving motet by Bach.

BWV 28/2a (231) and 118
 , originally BWV 231, later renumbered to BWV 28/2a, is the second movement of the motet , presented as a separate motet. Whether Bach extracted this motet (which is based on the second movement of the cantata BWV 28) from the three-movement motet or the cantata, and/or used it as a separate motet is not known.
 O Jesu Christ, meins Lebens Licht, BWV 118: originally listed as a cantata, in BWV2a listed as a (funeral) motet.

Parodies
 Der Gerechte kömmt um, BWV 1149, a chorale from a pasticcio passion oratorio, is a parody of the motet Tristis est anima mea which was likely composed by Johann Kuhnau. The arrangement is possibly Bach's, and it is possible Bach used it as a separate (funeral) motet.

BWV Anh. 159–165
  (I will not let you go [unless you bless me]), BWV Anh. 159, is a motet in F minor scored for double chorus (SATB–SATB) and unspecified instruments playing colla parte. The motet, which was formerly attributed to Bach's older cousin Johann Christoph Bach, appears to be one of Bach's earlier works, possibly composed during his Weimar period around 1712. Consequently, the motet was moved from BWV Anh. III (spurious works) to BWV Anh. II (doubtful works) in BWV2a. The final chorale of the motet is an adaptation of BWV 421, but that may also be a later addition to the motet. It draws its text from a verse taken from the Book of Genesis, from the scene of Jacob's Ladder, combined with the third stanza of the hymn "Warum betrübst du dich, mein Herz" by Erasmus Alberus.
 , BWV Anh. 160 (=TWV 8:10) is a three-movement pasticcio motet for SATB–SATB attributed to, among others, Bach and Georg Philipp Telemann. All that is certain regarding Bach's participation in the work is that its second movement derives from the second movement of Bach's cantata BWV 28.
 Motet movement Kündlich groß ist das gottselige Geheimnis, BWV Anh. 161, in D major for SATB, strings(?) and continuo, by Graun (possibly Carl Heinrich Graun), precedes laudes A and B of Bach's Magnificat in a three-movement Christmas motet pasticcio.
 Lob und Ehre und Weisheit und Dank, BWV Anh. 162, for SATB–SATB, by Georg Gottfried Wagner.
 Merk auf, mein Herz, und sieh dorthin, BWV Anh. 163, for SATB–SATB, by Johann Bernhard or Johann Ernst Bach.
 Nun danket alle Gott, BWV Anh. 164, for SSATB, by Johann Christoph Altnickol, Bach's son-in-law.
 Unser Wandel ist im Himmel, BWV Anh. 165, for SATB, after movements 2, 4 and 6 of cantata Mein Odem ist schwach, BWV 222, by Johann Ernst Bach.

Motets listed in the second chapter of the Bach-Werke-Verzeichnis (1998)

|- style="background: #E3F6CE;"
| data-sort-value="0225.000" | 225
| data-sort-value="228.002" | 2.
| data-sort-value="1727-01-01" | 1726–1727New Year?
| Motet Singet dem Herrn ein neues Lied
| B♭ maj.
| data-sort-value="SATBx2 +colla parte instruments?" | 2SATB (+colla parte instr.?)
| data-sort-value="000.39: 003" | 39: 3
| data-sort-value="III/01: 001" | III/1: 1
| after Z 8244 (/2); text after Ps. 149: 1–3 (/1), by Gramann after Ps. 103 (/2), after Ps. 150: 2, 6 (/3)
| 
|- style="background: #E3F6CE;"
| data-sort-value="0226.000" | 226
| data-sort-value="229.001" rowspan="2" | 2.
| rowspan="2" | 1729-10-20
| Motet Der Geist hilft unser Schwachheit auf (funeral of Ernesti, J. H.)
| B♭ maj.
| data-sort-value="SATBx2 Str Vc Obx2 Tai Bas" | 2SATB Str Vc 2Ob Tai Bas 
| data-sort-value="000.39: 039" | 39: 39, 143
| data-sort-value="III/01: 037" | III/1: 37
| after Z 7445a (/2); text after Rom. 8: 26–27 (/1), by Luther (/2)
| 
|- style="background: #E3F6CE;"
| data-sort-value="0226.002" | 226/2
| chorale setting "Komm, Heiliger Geist, Herre Gott" (s. 3)
| B♭ maj.G maj.
| SATB
| data-sort-value="000.39: 057" | 39: 57
| data-sort-value="III/02 1: 016" | III/2.1: 18III/2.2: 38
| after Z 7445a; text by Luther
| 
|- style="background: #F5F6CE;"
| data-sort-value="0227.000" | 227
| data-sort-value="229.002" rowspan="4" | 2.
| data-sort-value="1728-07-18" rowspan="4" | 
| Motet Jesu, meine Freude
| rowspan="4" | E min.
| data-sort-value="SSATB +colla parte instruments?" | SSATB (+colla parte instr.?) 
| data-sort-value="000.39: 059" | 39: 59
| data-sort-value="III/01: 075" | III/1: 75
| after Z 8032 (odd mvts); text by Franck, J. (odd mvts), after Rom. 8: 1–2, 9–11 (even mvts)
| 
|- style="background: #F5F6CE;"
| data-sort-value="0227.001" | 227/1227/11
| chorale setting "Jesu, meine Freude" (ss. 1, 6)
| SATB
| data-sort-value="000.39: 061" | 39: 61
| data-sort-value="III/02 1: 031" | III/2.1: 27III/2.2: 156
| after Z 8032; text by Franck, J.
| 
|- style="background: #F5F6CE;"
| data-sort-value="0227.003" | 227/3
| chorale setting "Jesu, meine Freude" (s. 2)
| SATB
| data-sort-value="000.39: 066" | 39: 66
| data-sort-value="III/02 1: 032" | III/2.1: 28
| after Z 8032; text by Franck, J.
| 
|- style="background: #F5F6CE;"
| data-sort-value="0227.007" | 227/7
| chorale setting "Jesu, meine Freude" (s. 4)
| SATB
| data-sort-value="000.39: 075" | 39: 75
| data-sort-value="III/02 1: 021" | III/2.1: 22III/2.2: 168
| after Z 8032; text by Franck, J.
| 
|- 
| data-sort-value="0228.000" | 228
| data-sort-value="231.001" | 2.
| data-sort-value="1715-07-01" | 
| Motet Fürchte dich nicht
| A maj.
| data-sort-value="SATBx2 +colla parte instruments?" | 2SATB (+colla parte instr.?) 
| data-sort-value="000.39: 087" | 39: 85
| data-sort-value="III/01: 107" | III/1: 105
| after Z 6461 (/2); text after Is. 41: 10 (/1), 43: 1 (/2), by Gerhardt (/2)
| 
|- style="background: #F6E3CE;"
| data-sort-value="0229.000" | 229
| data-sort-value="231.002" | 2.
| data-sort-value="1730-07-01" | before 1731–1732
| Motet Komm, Jesu, komm
| G min.
| data-sort-value="SATBx2 +colla parte instruments" | 2SATB (+colla parte instr.) 
| data-sort-value="000.39: 109" | 39: 107
| data-sort-value="III/01: 127" | III/1: 125
| text by Thymich
| 
|- style="background: #F5F6CE;" 
| data-sort-value="0230.000" | 230
| data-sort-value="232.002" | 2.
| data-sort-value="1730-07-01" | 1723–1739?
| Motet Lobet den Herrn, alle Heiden
| C maj.
| data-sort-value="SATB Bc +colla parte instruments?" | SATB Bc (+colla parte instr.?) 
| data-sort-value="000.39: 129" | 39: 127
| data-sort-value="III/01: 149" | III/1: 147
| text after Ps. 117
| 
|-
| data-sort-value="0231.000" | 231
| data-sort-value="233.001" | 

|

| data-sort-value="Motet Sei Lob und Preis mit Ehren" | 

| 

| 

| 

| 

| see BWV 28/2a
| 
|- style="background: #E3F6CE;"
| data-sort-value="0118.100" | 118.1
| data-sort-value="233.003" | 2.
| data-sort-value="1736-12-31" | 1736–1737
| Motet O Jesu Christ, meins Lebens Licht (funeral)
| B♭ maj.
| data-sort-value="SATB Hnx2 Cnt Tbnx3" | SATB 2Hn Cnt 3Tbn 
| data-sort-value="000.24: 185" | 24: 185
| data-sort-value="III/01: 163" | III/1: 163
| text by Behm; → BWV 118.2
| 
|- style="background: #E3F6CE;"
| data-sort-value="0118.200" | 118.2
| data-sort-value="233.004" | 2.
| data-sort-value="1746-12-31" | 1746–1747
| Motet O Jesu Christ, meins Lebens Licht (funeral)
| B♭ maj.
| data-sort-value="SATB Obx2 Tai Bas Hnx2 Str Bc" | SATB 2Ob Tai Bas 2Hn Str Bc
| data-sort-value="000.67 1: 000" | NBG 171
| data-sort-value="III/01: 171" | III/1: 171
| text by Behm; after BWV 118.1
| 
|}

Publication and recording

Publications
St. Thomas School, Leipzig, appears to have kept the motets in the repertory of its Thomanerchor after Bach's death. It is documented that the choir performed Singet dem Herrn for Mozart in 1789.
The director on this occasion was the Thomaskantor Johann Friedrich Doles, a pupil of Bach.
The interest in Bach motets was sufficient for six of them to be printed for the first time in 1802/1803. They appeared in two volumes from the Leipzig publisher Breitkopf & Härtel. The editor is not credited on the title page; however, it has been suggested that the person responsible was Johann Gottfried Schicht, who was active in the city as a choral and orchestral conductor.

Book I consisted of
Singet dem Herrn ein neues Lied (BWV 225)
Fürchte dich nicht (BWV 228)
Ich lasse dich nicht (BWV Anh. 159)

Book II consisted of
Komm, Jesu, komm (BWV 229)
Jesu, meine Freude (BWV 227)
Der Geist hilft unser Schwachheit auf (BWV 228)  

In 1892 the motets were published as part of the Bach-Gesellschaft-Ausgabe, the first edition of the composer's complete works. The editor was Franz Wüllner, who did not accept Bach's authorship of Ich lasse dich nicht.
The  motet volume of the New Bach Edition (the second edition of the composer's complete works) came out in 1965. It includes O Jesu Christ, mein Lebens Licht (which had been included among the cantatas in the Bach-Gesellschaft-Ausgabe) and Lobet den Herrn.
The motets were published by Carus-Verlag in 1975, edited by Günter Graulich, and again in 2003, seven compositions edited by Uwe Wolf.

Recordings

Most recordings of the Bach motets have been made since the Second World War. The Thomanerchor, for example, recorded a set in the 1950s. However, there were several pre-War recordings of the motets. The first recording of a Bach motet was a 1927 version of Jesu, meine Freude.

A single CD can contain the set of six motets (BWV 225–230) plus other works. One of the decisions which needs to be made is which motets to include. 
Another decision is how many voices to use per part. The motets have been recorded with one voice per part by Konrad Junghänel. Most recordings deploy more than one singer per part; for example, Masaaki Suzuki and his Bach Collegium Japan use a chorus of eighteen singers.

References

Sources

External links 

 
 Johann Gottfried Schicht, editor. Joh. Seb. Bach's Motetten in Partitur. Leipzig: Breitkopf und Härtel. 1802 (Vol. 1: BWV 225, 228, Anh. 159); 1803 (Vol.2: BWV 229, 227, 226)
 Uwe Wolf: "Zur Schichtschen Typendruck-Ausgabe der Motetten Johann Sebastian Bachs und zu ihrer Stellung in der Werküberlieferung" in Musikalische Quellen, Quellen zur Musikgeschichte: Festschrift für Martin Staehelin zum 65. Geburtstag. Edited by Jürgen Heidrich, Hans Joachim Marx and Ulrich Konrad. Vandenhoeck & Ruprecht. 2002. ,  

Motets by Johann Sebastian Bach, List of